Roger More was an English Member of Parliament for Chipping Wycombe in May 1413, 1417, 1419, 1420, May 1421, 1423, 1431 and 1432.

References

14th-century births
15th-century deaths
15th-century English people